Fuli is a town under the administration of Yangshuo County, Guangxi, China, located in the southeastern part of the county just east of the county seat.

References 

Towns of Guilin
Yangshuo County